Markham, Texas is a census-designated place (CDP) in Matagorda County, Texas, United States. Named in 1903 for Charles H. Markham, a railroad engineer for Southern Pacific (and later President of the Illinois Central Railroad), the town was founded in 1901 as Cortes. In 1914, it was a designated stop on the Texas and New Orleans Railroad.

Geography
Markham is located at  (28.962944, -96.067712).

Markham lies southwest, approximately 90 miles or -hour drive to downtown Houston. Gulf coast Palacios Bay lies 22 miles southwest of Markham.

Demographics
As of the census of 2000, there were 1,138 people, 386 households, and 306 families residing in the CDP. The population density was 497.5 people per square mile (191.9/km2). There were 446 housing units at an average density of 195.0/sq mi (75.2/km2). The racial makeup of the CDP was 79.88% White, 9.93% African American, 0.09% Native American, 0.09% Asian, 7.91% from other races, and 2.11% from two or more races. Hispanic or Latino of any race were 36.03% of the population.

There were 386 households, out of which 39.9% had children under the age of 18 living with them, 61.7% were married couples living together, 11.9% had a female householder with no husband present, and 20.7% were non-families. 17.9% of all households were made up of individuals, and 7.0% had someone living alone who was 65 years of age or older. The average household size was 2.95 and the average family size was 3.35.

In the CDP, the population was spread out, with 31.5% under the age of 18, 8.3% from 18 to 24, 27.4% from 25 to 44, 22.1% from 45 to 64, and 10.7% who were 65 years of age or older. The median age was 33 years. For every 100 females, there were 96.2 males. For every 100 females age 18 and over, there were 90.9 males.

The median income for a household in the CDP was $41,900, and the median income for a family was $49,792. Males had a median income of $32,391 versus $20,938 for females. The per capita income for the CDP was $17,302. About 7.6% of families and 11.4% of the population were below the poverty line, including 15.3% of those under age 18 and 19.7% of those age 65 or over.

Education
Markham is served by the Tidehaven Independent School District.

The designated community college for Tidehaven ISD is Wharton County Junior College.

References

External links
 

Census-designated places in Matagorda County, Texas
Census-designated places in Texas